Denis Petrashov (born February 1, 2000) is a Kyrgyzstani competitive swimmer. He competed in the Men's 200-meter breaststroke event at the 2016 Summer Olympics and both the Men's 100-meter (swimming a 1:00.23, setting a Kyrgyzstani national record) and 200-meter breaststroke events at the 2021 Summer Olympics. Petrashov won the silver medal in the 100-meter breaststroke at the 2018 Youth Olympics, and gold medals at the 2022 Maccabiah Games in Israel in the 100 m and 200 m breaststroke events.

Biography
Petrashov's hometown is Bishkek, Kyrgyzstan.  His father is former three-time Olympian and former breaststroke national record holder Yevgeny Petrashov.

He competed in the Men's 200-meter breaststroke event at the 2016 Summer Olympics and both the Men's 100-meter (swimming a 1:00.23, setting a Kyrgyzstani national record) and 200-meter breaststroke events at the 2021 Summer Olympics. 

Petrashov won the gold medal in the 200-meter breaststroke at the 10th Asian Age Group Swimming Championships 2019 in Bangalore, India. He won two silver medals. in men's 50 and 100 meters breaststroke.

He is also a 2-time Asian Games finalist, and a Youth Olympics silver medalist.  Petrashov currently holds national record Kyrgyz records (breaststroke long course).

Petrashov won gold medals at the 2022 Maccabiah Games in Israel in the 100 m (in a time of 1:00.46, bettering the record set in the prior Maccabiah Games by American B.J. Johnson) and 200 m breaststroke events.

Attending the University of Louisville and competing for the Louisville Cardinals, in 2022 Petrashov swam 51.92/1:51.89. At the 2022 Atlantic Coast Conference (ACC) Championships, he was runner-up in the 200 breaststroke and seventh in the 100 breaststroke. He did not score at the 2022 NCAAs, after losing a swim-off for 16th in the 100, and not matching his ACC 200 breast time.

Major results

See also
List of flag bearers for Kyrgyzstan at the Olympics
List of Kyrgyzstani records in swimming
"The Top Ranked Swimmers of All-Time from Kyrgyzstan"

References

External links
 
 Instagram pagea

2000 births
Living people
Louisville Cardinals men's swimmers
Olympic swimmers of Kyrgyzstan
Swimmers at the 2016 Summer Olympics
Sportspeople from Bishkek
Swimmers at the 2018 Summer Youth Olympics
Swimmers at the 2018 Asian Games
Asian Games competitors for Kyrgyzstan
Kyrgyzstani male breaststroke swimmers
Swimmers at the 2020 Summer Olympics
Kyrgyzstani Jews
Jewish swimmers
Maccabiah Games medalists in swimming
Competitors at the 2017 Maccabiah Games
Competitors at the 2022 Maccabiah Games
Maccabiah Games gold medalists for Kyrgyzstan